Indoor field hockey was contested at the 2005 World Games  as an invitational sport. It has not been contested in any edition of the World Games ever since.

Medalists

Men

Women

Men's tournament

Women's tournament

See also
Indoor Hockey World Cup

References

World Games
Indoor Hockey